Allahabad-e Dehqani (also Romanized as Allāhābād-e Dehqānī) is a village in Hoseynabad Rural District, Esmaili District, Anbarabad County, Kerman Province, Iran. At the 2006 census, its population was 485, in 91 families.

References 

Populated places in Anbarabad County